Ethmia millerorum is a moth in the family Depressariidae. The habitat consists of rain forests.

The ground color of the forewings is white with a large quadrate dorsal purplish coppery blotch at the posterior half from near the base to the tornus. The costal area has four blackish spots at the base and there is one distinct spot at the dorsum. The hindwing ground colour is whitish, but darker towards the margin.

The larvae feed on Bourreria costaricensis.

Etymology
The species is named in honor of Kenton and Sue Miller for their lifetime encouragement and support of conservation of global biodiversity.

References

Moths described in 2014
millerorum